Bathytoma bitorquata is a species of sea snail, a marine gastropod mollusk in the family Borsoniidae.

Distribution
This species occurs in the Indian Ocean off Tanzania.

References

bitorquata
Gastropods described in 1901